Gallo-Italic of Sicily is a group of Gallo-Italic languages found in about 15 isolated communities of central eastern Sicily. Forming a language island in the otherwise Sicilian language area, it dates back to migrations from northern Italy during the reign of Norman Roger I of Sicily and his successors.

Towns inhabited by the new immigrants became known as the "Lombard communities". The settlers, known as the Lombards of Sicily, actually came principally from the Aleramici fiefdoms of southern Montferrat, comprising today south-eastern Piedmont and north-western Liguria, "Lombardy" being the name for the whole of northern Italy during the Middle Ages. In addition to a common place of origin, the colonizers brought their Gallo-Italic languages. These languages added to the Gallic influence of the developing Sicilian language (influences which included Norman and Old Occitan) to become the Gallo-Italic of Sicily language family.

History

Although Roger I took 30 years to take complete control of Sicily (from 1061 to 1091), by 1080 he had effective control of much of the island. During this conquest, some areas of central Sicily became depopulated as some, but far from all, of its Muslim population was expelled. Roger and his Norman successors encouraged migration to the region, especially by those closely allied with the Latin Church. Much of the migration was from northern Italy, particularly from his wife's family holdings in Piedmont and Liguria.

Areas spoken
The languages are spoken primarily in the following areas:
 Province of Messina: Acquedolci, Montalbano Elicona, Novara di Sicilia, Fondachelli-Fantina San Fratello and San Piero Patti
 Province of Enna: Aidone, Nicosia, Piazza Armerina and Sperlinga

Other linguistic communities also existed in:
 Province of Messina: Roccella Valdemone, Motta d'Affermo and Castel di Lucio
 Province of Enna: Enna, Pietraperzia, Agira, Leonforte and Cerami
 Province of Catania: Caltagirone, Militello in Val di Catania, Mirabella Imbaccari, San Michele di Ganzaria, Paternò, Randazzo and Bronte
 Province of Syracuse: Ferla, Buccheri and Cassaro
 Province of Caltanissetta: Butera and Mazzarino
 Province of Palermo: Corleone and Vicari
In some of these towns, the northern Italian influence on the local varieties of Sicilian is marked; in others, the Lombard communities did not influence the local dialect. Similar communities have survived outside Sicily in Basilicata in southern Italy, which was subject to similar influences; the dialects spoken there are known as Gallo-Italic of Basilicata.

Bibliography
F. Piazza, Le colonie e i dialetti lombardo-siculi, Catania, 1921.
Illuminato Peri, "La questione delle colonie lombarde di Sicilia", BSSS 57, 3-4 (1959), pp. 3–30.
Giorgio Piccitto, "Testi aidonesi inediti o ignoti", L'Italia dialettale 25, n.s. 2 (1962), pp. 38–100.
G. Petracco, "Influenze genovesi sulle colonie gallo-italiche delle Sicilia?", BCSic 9 (1965), pp. 106–132.
Giovanni Tropea, Il vocabolario siciliano manoscritto inedito di Giuseppe Trischitta da Furci Siculo, in: Saggi e ricerche in memoria di Ettore Li Gatti, 3 voll. BCSic [Bollettino del Centro di studi filologici e linguistici siciliani], (Palermo) 6-8 (1962).
IDEM, "Un dialetto moribondo, il gallo-italico di Francavilla Sicula", BCSic 9 (1965) pp. 133–152.
IDEM, La letteralizzazione dei dialetti gallo-italici di Sicilia, in: Lingua parlata e lingua scritta, Convegno di studi 9-11 nov. 1967. BCSic 11 (1970) pp. 453–479.
IDEM, "Effetti della simbiosi linguistica nella parlata gallo-italica di Aidone, Nicosia e Novara di Sicilia", BALI [Bollettino dell'Atlante Linguistico Italiano], n.s. 13-14 (1966), pp. 3–50.
IDEM, Parlata locale, siciliano e lingua nazionale nelle colonie gallo-italiche della Sicilia, in: Atti del 3° Convegno Nazionale della Cultura Abruzzese; del VI Convegno del CSDI; del 948° Circolo Linguistico Fiorentino. Vol. II: Linguistica. Vol. III: Dialettologia, Pescara, Istituto di Studi Abruzzesi. Abruzzo, Rivista dell'Istituto di Studi Abruzzesi, (Pescara) 8, 1-3 (Gennaio-Dicembre 1970).
IDEM, "Testi aidonesi inediti", Memorie dell'Istituto Lonmbardo di Scienze, Lettere e Arti, Milano, 33, 5 (1973).
IDEM, Considerazioni sul trilinguismo della colonia galloitalica di San Fratello, in Dal dialetto alla lingua, Atti del IX Convegno per gli Studi Dialettali Italiani. Lecce, 28 settembre - 1 ottobre 1972. Pisa, Pacini, 1974.
IDEM, "Italiano di Sicilia", L'Orizzonte, 4, Palermo, Aragne, 1976.
IDEM, Testi sanfratellani in trascrizione fonetica, in: Vittore Pisani et alii (ed.), Italia linguistica nuova e antica. Studi linguistici in memoria di Oronzo Perlangèli, 2 vol., Università degli Studi di Bari, Facoltà di Magistero, Galatina, Congedo Editore, 1976–1978.
IDEM, Vocabolario siciliano, fondato da Giorgio Piccitto, 4 voll. Catania-Palermo, Centro di Studi Filologici Siciliani, 1977, 1985, 1990, 1997.

See also
 Lombard languages
 Western dialects of Lombard language
 Gallo-Italic of Basilicata

Notes

External links
Ethonologue about Western Lombard which includes Gallo-Italic of Sicily

Gallo-Italic languages
Languages of Sicily